The Peninsula Times began publication on 23 August 1994. It was a free English language tabloid newspaper distributed to 200,000 households in the Western Cape, started by entrepreneur Marthinus Strydom. During September 2004 Naspers acquired 70% of the newspaper for an undisclosed amount.

Two editions were available: one for the southern and one for the northern parts of Cape Town. Marthinus Strydom, founder and director of the paper, said that the paper was not out to make a war against the existing dailies in Cape Town. The idea of a new, encompassing tabloid in the Cape was born 1993 when Strydom was the director of the Northern Times. He approached Naspers at the beginning of 1993 and a deal was made. The newspaper had a staff of 32 freelance and 5 full-time journalists. The tabloid featured in-depth investigative reporting as well as news analysis and human interest stories.

In 1995 Nasionale Pers acquired the remainder of the shareholding and integrated the newspaper into its other regional free-sheet newspapers.

References 

Defunct newspapers published in South Africa
Publications established in 1994
Publications disestablished in 1995
1994 establishments in South Africa
1995 disestablishments in South Africa